Hylaeus brevicornis  is a Palearctic species of  solitary bee.

References

External links
Images representing Hylaeus brevicornis 

Hymenoptera of Europe
Colletidae
Insects described in 1852